Ooh Yeah! is the thirteenth studio album by American pop rock duo Daryl Hall & John Oates, released on April 28, 1988. It was their first studio release in four years and their first with Arista Records. Though the album went platinum in the United States and produced a No. 3 entry with the single "Everything Your Heart Desires", as well as the singles "Missed Opportunity" and  "Downtown Life" reaching number 29 and 31 respectively, it charted lower, and sold fewer copies than the band's previous albums. Ooh Yeah! is the last Hall & Oates album with Janna Allen contributing to the writing team. She died in 1993 of leukemia.

Reception
Cash Box called "Downtown Life" a "sophisticated and creatively arranged tune, featuring a blistering funk groove combined with a heavy guitar feel."

Track listing

Personnel

The band 
 Daryl Hall – lead vocals, backing vocals, keyboards, electric guitars, synth bass, vibraphone
 John Oates – backing vocals, lead vocals on "Rockability" and "Keep on Pushin' Love", synthesizers, guitars, Linn 9000 programming
 Tom "T-Bone" Wolk –accordion, guitars, bass guitar, synth bass, vibraphone
 Jeff Bova – synthesizer programming, sequencing
 Pat Buchanan – lead and rhythm guitars
 Tony Beard – drums
 Jimmy Bralower – drum programming, sequencing
 Sammy Merendino – drum programming, sequencing, timbales
 Sammy Figueroa – percussion
 Mark Rivera – saxophones

Additional musicians 
 James Hellman – synthesizer programming
 Philippe Saisse – synthesizer programming, keyboards on "Rockability" and "Keep on Pushin' Love"
 Paul Pesco – guitar on "Realove"
 Jimmy Rip – guitar on "Realove"
 Rick Iantosca – tom toms on "Downtown Life"
 Bashiri Johnson – percussion on "Everything Your Heart Desires"
 Jerry Goodman – electric violin on "Downtown Life"
 Danny Wilensky – saxophone on "Talking All Night"
 Lenny Pickett – saxophone on "Realove"
 Janna Allen – additional backing vocals on "Rockability"
 Keisuke Kuwata – vocals on "Realove"
 Narada Michael Walden –  additional arrangements on "Rockability"

Crew 
 James Hellman – MIDI technician, keyboard technician
 Mike Klvana – Synclavier and keyboard technician
 Mel Terpos – guitar technician
 Vince Guttman – drum technician

Production 
 Arranged and produced by Daryl Hall, John Oates and Tom "T-Bone" Wolk.
 Recorded by Mike Scott; assisted by Gary Wright.
 Tracks 1, 3, 6 & 10 mixed by Bob Clearmountain; assisted by Roger Tarkov and Craig Vogel.
 Tracks 4, 7 & 9 mixed by Chris Porter; assisted by Mark Corbin and Scott Forman.
 Tracks 2, 5 & 8 mixed by Mike Scott; assisted by Gary Wright.
 Mastered by Bob Ludwig at Masterdisk (New York City, NY).
 Art direction – Maude Gilman
 Photography and hand-tinting – Laura Levine
 Management and direction – Tommy Mottola

Charts

Weekly charts

Year-end charts

Certifications

References

1988 albums
Arista Records albums
Hall & Oates albums